Huo Liang (born 15 October 1989) is a Chinese footballer currently playing as a full-back for Meizhou Hakka.

Club career
Huo Liang would play for third tier club Qinghai Senke until their disbandment at the end of the 2013 China League Two season. He would join another third tier club in Baotou Nanjiao before joining second tier club Meizhou Hakka where he made his debut in a league game on 11 March 2017 against Dalian Yifang that ended in a 2-0 defeat. He would gain a reputation as a tough tackling, highly confrontational, versatile full-back, which resulted in him receiving a six games suspension and being fined 60,000 yuan for insulting the referee during the 15 June 2019 league game against Heilongjiang Lava Spring that ended in a 2-1 defeat. He would be a squad player as the club gained promotion to the top tier after coming second within the division at the end of the 2021 China League One campaign.

Career statistics
.

References

External links

1989 births
Living people
Chinese footballers
Association football midfielders
China League Two players
China League One players
Meizhou Hakka F.C. players